Brighton and Hove City Council is a unitary authority in East Sussex, England. It was created as Brighton and Hove Borough Council on 1 April 1997 replacing Brighton and Hove Borough Councils. It was granted city status in 2001.

Brighton Borough Council elections and Hove Borough Council elections took place in alternating patterns from 1974 when Local Government reorganisation last took place.

Political control
The first election to the council was held in 1996, initially operating as a shadow authority prior to taking over from the two outgoing councils on 1 April 1997. Since the first election political control of the council has been held by the following parties:

Leadership
The first leader of the council following the merger, Steve Bassam, had been the last leader of the abolished Brighton Borough Council. In 2011, Brighton and Hove City Council appointed Bill Randall of the Green Party as leader, being the party's first council leader in the United Kingdom. The leaders of Brighton and Hove since its creation in 1997 have been:

Council elections
See Brighton Borough Council elections or Hove Borough Council elections for election prior to 1996
1996 Brighton and Hove Borough Council election
1999 Brighton and Hove Borough Council election
2003 Brighton and Hove City Council election (New ward boundaries)
2007 Brighton and Hove City Council election
2011 Brighton and Hove City Council election
2015 Brighton and Hove City Council election
2019 Brighton and Hove City Council election

Overview

Election Results

District result maps

By-election results

Overview

1995–1999

1999–2003

2003–2007

2007–2011

2011–2015

2015–2019

2019–2023

References

By-election results

External links
Brighton & Hove City Council

 
Unitary authority elections in England
Council elections in East Sussex